Shib Ab Bandan (also Romanized as Shīb Āb Bandān) is a village in Hasan Reza Rural District, in the Central District of Juybar County, Mazandaran Province, Iran. At the 2006 census, its population was 696, in 164 families.

References 

Populated places in Juybar County